In mathematics, a Hankel contour is a path in the complex plane which extends from 
(+∞,δ), around the origin counter clockwise and back to
(+∞,−δ), where δ is an arbitrarily small positive number. The contour thus remains arbitrarily close to the real axis but without crossing the real axis except for negative values of x. The Hankel contour can also be represented by a path that has mirror images just above and below the real axis, connected to a circle of radius ε, centered at the origin, where ε is an arbitrarily small number. The two linear portions of the contour are said to be a distance of δ from the real axis. Thus, the total distance between the linear portions of the contour is 2δ. The contour is traversed in the positively-oriented sense, meaning that the circle around the origin is traversed counter-clockwise.

Use of Hankel contours is one of the methods of contour integration. This type of path for contour integrals was first used by Hermann Hankel in his investigations of the Gamma function.

The Hankel contour is used to evaluate integrals such as the Gamma function, the Riemann zeta function, and other Hankel functions (which are Bessel functions of the third kind).

Applications

The Hankel contour and the Gamma function 
The Hankel contour is helpful in expressing and solving the Gamma function in the complex t-plane. The Gamma function can be defined for any complex value in the plane if we evaluate the integral along the Hankel contour. The Hankel contour is especially useful for expressing the Gamma function for any complex value because the end points of the contour vanish, and thus allows the fundamental property of the Gamma function to be satisfied, which states .

Derivation of the contour integral expression of the Gamma function 

To satisfy the fundamental property of the Gamma function, it follows that

after multiplying both sides by z.

Thus, given that the endpoints of the Hankel contour vanish, the left- and right-hand sides reduce to

.

Using differential equations,

becomes the general solution. While A is constant with respect to t, it holds that A may fluctuate depending on the complex number z.  Since A(z) is arbitrary, a complex exponential in z may be absorbed into the definition of A(z).  Substituting f(t) into the original integral then gives .

By integrating along the Hankel contour, the contour integral expression of the Gamma function becomes .

References

Further reading 

 Schmelzer, Thomas; Trefethen, Lloyd N. (2007-01). "Computing the Gamma Function Using Contour Integrals and Rational Approximations". SIAM Journal on Numerical Analysis. 45 (2): 558–571. . .
 Hugh L. Montgomery; Robert C. Vaughan (2007). Multiplicative number theory I. Classical theory. Cambridge tracts in advanced mathematics. 97. p. 515. .

External links 

 http://mathworld.wolfram.com/HankelContour.html
 NIST Digital Library of Mathematical Functions:Gamma Function:Integral Representation

Complex analysis
Special functions